An obelisk is a tall, four-sided monument.

Obelisk may also refer to:

Geography
 Obelisk Beach, a beach in New South Wales, Australia
 Obelisk Col, a mountain pass on James Ross Island in Antarctica
 Obelisk Mountain, a mountain in Antarctica
 Obelisk Hill, a former name of Monument Hill, the site of the Fremantle War Memorial
 Obelisk Islet, an island in the Torres Strait in Queensland, Australia

Fiction
 Obelisk, a fictional weapon in the game Command & Conquer
 Obelisk the Tormentor, a Yu-Gi-Oh! God card
 "The Obelisk", a minicomic in the Masters of the Universe comic line

Music
 The Obelisk, a predecessor of the alternative band The Cure
 "Obelisk", a song by the metalcore band Northlane from the album Node

Other uses
 Obelisk (hieroglyph), an Ancient Egyptian hieroglyph
 Obelisk (Prague Castle), a monolith and World War I monument in Prague, Czech Republic
 Obelisk (Sanssouci), a structure at the eastern entrance to Sanssouci Park in Potsdam, Germany
 Obelisk (typography) or dagger (†), a typographical symbol
 Obelisk posture, a position that some dragonflies and damselflies assume to avoid overheating
 Obelisk Press, a Paris publisher
 Obelisk ship, a type of ship historically used to transport obelisks
 The Obelisk, a painting by Hubert Robert (1733-1808)

See also
 Monolith
 Obelism
 Obelix, a character in the Asterix comic strips
 Obelus, a symbol (÷) which is distinct from the symbol called obelisk or dagger
 Stele